1st Michigan Infantry Regiment may refer to:

 1st Michigan Infantry Regiment (3 Months), existed in 1861
 1st Michigan Infantry Regiment (3 years), existed 1861-1865
 1st Michigan Sharpshooters Regiment, existed 1863-1865
 1st Michigan Colored Volunteer Infantry Regiment, existed 1864-1865

See also
 1st Michigan Cavalry Regiment
 1st Michigan Engineers and Mechanics Regiment
 List of Michigan Civil War units